Canada West is a regional membership association for universities in Western Canada which assists in co-ordinating competition between their university level athletic programs and providing contact information, schedules, results, and releases about those programs and events to the public and the media. This is similar to what would be called a college athletic conference in the United States. Canada West is one of four such bodies that are members of the country's governing body for university athletics, U Sports. The other three regional associations coordinating university-level sports in Canada are Ontario University Athletics (OUA), Atlantic University Sport (AUS), and the Réseau du sport étudiant du Québec (RSEQ).

History

The Western Canadian Intercollegiate Athletic Union (WCIAU — later renamed Western Canadian Intercollegiate Athletic Association) was formed in 1919–20 as the first recognized western-based post-secondary athletic organization in Canada, with the University of Manitoba winning the first-ever league championship, a men's hockey title, in 1920.

In the spring of 1972, the WCIAA was split into the Canada West Universities Athletic Association (CWUAA) and the Great Plains Athletic Association (GPAA - later renamed the Great Plains Athletic Conference).

CWUAA consisted of schools spanning from Victoria to Saskatoon (Victoria, British Columbia, Calgary, Alberta, Lethbridge and Saskatchewan), while GPAA's member institutions stretched from Regina to Thunder Bay (Regina, Brandon, Winnipeg, Manitoba, Lakehead).

Membership changes
In 1985–86, Canada West offered playing privileges to men's hockey teams from the Great Plains Athletic Conference (GPAC) with other sports following over the years, culminating with the 2001-02 merger of basketball.

Since 1999, 11 additional schools have joined the Canada West's six charter members. Trinity Western joined in 1999–00 and, in 2000–01, all schools from the Great Plains Athletic Conference (GPAC) except for Brandon were provided full membership in Canada West (Manitoba, Regina and Winnipeg). Brandon joined as an associate member at the time, until full membership was granted in 2005.

Simon Fraser joined Canada West in 2000, followed by Thompson Rivers in 2005 and Fraser Valley in 2006.

Simon Fraser withdrew from the conference as a member after the 2009–10 season, following this, Simon Fraser officially became the first Canadian university to join the NCAA in the 2011–12 season.while both Thompson Rivers and Fraser Valley were awarded full membership in 2010 and, at the same time, UBC Okanagan received probationary membership.

In 2011, Mount Royal University and the University of Northern British Columbia were voted in as probationary members and began active competing in 2012–13.

In 2013, UBC Okanagan was awarded full membership, while Mount Royal University and the University of Northern British Columbia were awarded full membership in 2014.

Full membership was granted to MacEwan University in the spring of 2015, after the Edmonton-based university fulfilled their probationary membership requirements and was accepted by Canada West membership as the conference's 17th member.

Member schools

Current members

Former member

Facilities

(Data mined from the U Sports homepage's member directory and WorldStadiums.com. The member directory numbers seem to be ballpark figures in some cases.)

Future expansion

The media has reported that the following institutions are building their athletic programs for potential admission into the association.

Capilano University
Vancouver Island University

In 2012 the conference declared they would not take applications from new schools, as Canada West approved a bid from Grant MacEwan University (Now rebranded as MacEwan University) in 2013.

Scholarships, UBC, Simon Fraser University, and the NAIA

In May 2005, UBC made a formal bid to join the NCAA, but decided in April 2011 to remain a part of Canada West Athletics. See the UBC article for more details.

Simon Fraser (known as the SFU Clan) did not compete in what is now known as U Sports until 2002, after a failed attempt to join the U.S. NCAA. On July 10, 2009, the NCAA accepted SFU's bid to join NCAA Division II in the 2011–2012 season. Canada West proceeded as a 13-team, 14 member conference for 2010–11, with the inclusion of UBC-Okanagan as a non-competing, probationary member for 2010–11, in time to begin competition (pending summer 2011 CIS approval) for the 2011–12 season. In May 2011 Mount Royal was awarded Canada West membership, effective Sept. 2011, with competition to begin in the 2012–13 season. In May 2013 MacEwan (Formally Grant MacEwan) approved as a 17th Canada West member starting in the 2013–2014 season.

From its inception in 1965, Simon Fraser competed in the NAIA to allow "full ride" scholarships. Canadian schools did not allow any form of scholarships until the late 1980s. SFU was forced to leave the NAIA in many sports due to schools in the Northwest US shifting to the NCAA. Until 2009, the NCAA limited membership to schools based in the U.S. Some Simon Fraser teams still competed in the U.S. before the school moved to the NCAA, and their men's wrestling program competed in the then-CIS and the NAIA. UBC has several of its programs (baseball, golf, outdoor track and field and softball) compete in the NAIA.

Canada West TV 
On August 24, 2011, the association announced the launch of Canadawest.tv as the official home of web-based broadcasting for all 14 Canada West member institutions during the 2011–12 season and beyond.  On May 10, 2017, Canada West announced a multi-year deal with Surrey, BC based streaming company, Yare Media, to develop a re-vamped service for the 2017–18 season.    In 2017, a dramatic 59-yard field goal kick by Niko DiFonte with two seconds on the clock lifted the Calgary Dinos over the UBC Thunderbirds to win the 81st Hardy Cup football championship in November. Immediately, the footage circulated across mainstream media. Not only did the clip of the record-breaking kick get coverage on television networks and social media channels across North America – including Sportsnet, TSN, CBC, ESPN, NFL.com and USA Today – but it also showcased the streaming quality of the new-look Canada West TV.

In January 2018, Canada West announced record viewing numbers for the new service.  On June 8, 2020, the conference announced cancellation of fall sports and no events were featured on Canadawest.tv.   Throughout the remainder of 2020 the conference would announce a series of cancellations.   The conference announced the resumption of Canadawest.tv streaming on Aug 3, 2021.  The 2021–2022 season marked the tenth year of Canada West TV service and the first year with streaming partner Visaic after its acquisition of Yare Media in 2020.

Awards

References

External links
 
Canadawest.tv

U Sports
College athletics conferences in Canada
U Sports basketball
U Sports football
U Sports volleyball
Sport in Western Canada